The Sultan Abdul Samad Mosque or KLIA Mosque is a mosque near Kuala Lumpur International Airport (KLIA) at Sepang District, Selangor, Malaysia. The mosque was originally named as KLIA Mosque and was officially named after Almarhum Sultan Sir Abdul Samad of Selangor. It is also used as an international mosque for tourist who arrived and depart from/to KLIA. It is also a public mosque for Muslims from Salak Tinggi and KLIA Town Centre.

History
The mosque was constructed by the Malaysia Airports Holdings Berhad in which is an operator for the KLIA. When the opening of the KLIA on 27 June 1998, the construction of the mosque began in 1997 and was completed in 1999. The mosque was officially opened on 12 August 2000 by the Regent of Selangor at that time, Tengku Idris Shah (now Sultan Sharafuddin Idris Shah).

Architecture
It drew influences from Middle Eastern and local Malay styles.

See also
 Islam in Malaysia

Mosques in Selangor
Sepang District
1999 establishments in Malaysia
Mosques completed in 1999
Mosque buildings with domes
20th-century architecture in Malaysia